Wendy Anne Rogers  (born 1957) is a professor of clinical ethics at Macquarie University in Sydney, Australia. She was nominated as one of Nature's 10 people who mattered in 2019 for revealing ethical failures in China’s studies on organ transplantation.

Education
Rogers was educated at Flinders University where she was awarded a PhD in 1998 on morality in general practice.

Career and research
Rogers works on practical bioethics and overdiagnosis. She has interests in Artificial Intelligence (AI), medical ethics, Artificial intelligence in healthcare and ethics in surgery.

Awards and honours
Rogers was nominated as one of Nature's 10 people who mattered in 2019 for revealing ethical failures in China's studies on organ transplantation. Nature cited her report in BMJ Open, which analysed 445 Chinese studies which described >85,000 individual transplants, and found that 99% did not adequately prove consent for the transplantation procedure. In 2019, she received the ethics award from the National Health and Medical Research Council (NHMRC) and was named as the national research leader in the field of bioethics by The Australian newspaper. She was elected a Fellow of the Australian Academy of the Humanities in 2021.

References

Living people
Australian ethicists
Australian philosophers
1957 births
Australian women philosophers
Fellows of the Australian Academy of the Humanities